Vijay Bharti (born 26 October 1993) is an Indian cricketer. He made his List A debut for Bihar in the 2018–19 Vijay Hazare Trophy on 14 October 2018. He made his Twenty20 debut for Bihar in the 2018–19 Syed Mushtaq Ali Trophy on 22 February 2019.

References

External links
 

1993 births
Living people
Indian cricketers
Bihar cricketers
Place of birth missing (living people)